Ilja Matouš (born 17 April 1931 – 24 April 2018) was a Czech cross-country skier. He competed in the men's 15 kilometre event at the 1956 Winter Olympics.

References

External links
 

1931 births
2018 deaths
Czech male cross-country skiers
Olympic cross-country skiers of Czechoslovakia
Cross-country skiers at the 1956 Winter Olympics
People from Semily District
Sportspeople from the Liberec Region